The London Look EP by Herman's Hermits was the band's seventh and last EP and was released in the United Kingdom (catalogue number SLE 15.) It was a promo only issue sponsored by Yardley cosmetics.

Track listing 
Side 1
"No Milk Today" (Graham Gouldman)
"There's a Kind of Hush All Over The World" (Les Reed, Geoff Stephens)

Side 2
"Mrs. Brown, You've Got a Lovely Daughter" (Trevor Peacock)
"London Look" (Gouldman)

External links 
plutomusic.com

Herman's Hermits albums
1968 EPs